Master data management (MDM) is a technology-enabled discipline in which business and information technology work together to ensure the uniformity, accuracy, stewardship, semantic consistency and accountability of the enterprise's official shared master data assets.

Drivers for master data management 
Organisations, or groups of organisations, may establish the need for master data management when they hold more than one copy of data about a business entity.  Holding more than one copy of this master data inherently means that there is an inefficiency in maintaining a "single version of the truth" across all copies. Unless people, processes and technology are in place to ensure that the data values are kept aligned across all copies, it is almost inevitable that different versions of information about a business entity will be held.  This causes inefficiencies in operational data use, and hinders the ability of organisations to report and analyze.  At a basic level, master data management seeks to ensure that an organization does not use multiple (potentially inconsistent) versions of the same master data in different parts of its operations, which can occur in large organizations. 

Other problems include (for example) issues with the quality of data, consistent classification and identification of data, and data-reconciliation issues.  Master data management of disparate data systems requires data transformations as the data extracted from the disparate source data system is transformed and loaded into the master data management hub.  To synchronize the disparate source master data, the managed master data extracted from the master data management hub is again transformed and loaded into the disparate source data system as the master data is updated.  As with other Extract, Transform, Load-based data movement, these processes are expensive and inefficient to develop and to maintain which greatly reduces the return on investment for the master data management product.

There are a number of root causes for master data issues in organisations.  These include:

 Business unit and product line segmentation
 Mergers and acquisitions

Business unit and product line segmentation 
As a result of business unit and product line segmentation, the same business entity (such as Customer, Supplier, Product) will be serviced by different product lines; redundant data will be entered about the business entity in order to process the transaction. The redundancy of business entity data is compounded in the front- to back-office life cycle, where the authoritative single source for the party, account and product data is needed but is often once again redundantly entered or augmented.

A typical example is the scenario of a bank at which a customer has taken out a mortgage and the bank begins to send mortgage solicitations to that customer, ignoring the fact that the person already has a mortgage account relationship with the bank. This happens because the customer information used by the marketing section within the bank lacks integration with the customer information used by the customer services section of the bank.  Thus the two groups remain unaware that an existing customer is also considered a sales lead. The process of record linkage is used to associate different records that correspond to the same entity, in this case the same person.

Mergers and acquisitions 
One of the most common reasons some large corporations experience massive issues with master data management is growth through mergers or acquisitions.  Any organizations which merge will typically create an entity with duplicate master data (since each likely had at least one master database of its own prior to the merger).  Ideally, database administrators resolve this problem through deduplication of the master data as part of the merger. In practice, however, reconciling several master data systems can present difficulties because of the dependencies that existing applications have on the master databases.  As a result, more often than not the two systems do not fully merge, but remain separate, with a special reconciliation process defined that ensures consistency between the data stored in the two systems.  Over time, however, as further mergers and acquisitions occur, the problem multiplies, more and more master databases appear, and data-reconciliation processes become extremely complex, and consequently unmanageable and unreliable. Because of this trend, one can find organizations with 10, 15, or even as many as 100 separate, poorly integrated master databases, which can cause serious operational problems in the areas of customer satisfaction, operational efficiency, decision support, and regulatory compliance.

Another problem concerns determining the proper degree of detail and normalization to include in the master data schema. For example, in a federated HR environment, the enterprise may focus on storing people data as a current status, adding a few fields to identify date of hire, date of last promotion, etc. However this simplification can introduce business impacting errors into dependent systems for planning and forecasting. The stakeholders of such systems may be forced to build a parallel network of new interfaces to track onboarding of new hires, planned retirements, and divestment, which works against one of the aims of master data management.

People, process and technology 
Master data management is enabled by technology, but is more than the technologies that enable it.  An organisation's master data management capability will include also people and process in its definition.

People 
Several roles should be staffed within MDM. Most prominently the Data Owner and the Data Steward. Probably several people would be allocated to each role, each person responsible for a subset of Master Data (e.g. one data owner for employee master data, another for customer master data).

The Data Owner is responsible for the requirements for data quality, data security etc. as well as for compliance with data governance and data management procedures. The Data Owner should also be funding improvement projects  in case of deviations from the requirements.

The Data Steward is running the master data management on behalf of the data owner and probably also being an advisor to the Data Owner.

Process 
Master data management can be viewed as a "discipline for specialized quality improvement" defined by the policies and procedures put in place by a data governance organization.  It has the objective of providing processes for collecting, aggregating, matching, consolidating, quality-assuring, persisting and distributing master data throughout an organization to ensure a common understanding, consistency, accuracy and control, in the ongoing maintenance and application use of that data.  

Processes commonly seen in master data management include source identification, data collection, data transformation, normalization, rule administration, error detection and correction, data consolidation, data storage, data distribution, data classification, taxonomy services, item master creation, schema mapping, product codification, data enrichment, hierarchy management, business semantics management and data governance.

Technology 
A master data management tool can be used to support master data management by removing duplicates, standardizing data (mass maintaining), and incorporating rules to eliminate incorrect data from entering the system in order to create an authoritative source of master data. Master data are the products, accounts and parties for which the business transactions are completed. 

Where the technology approach produces a "golden record" or relies on a "source of record" or "system of record", it is common to talk of where the data is "mastered".  This is accepted terminology in the information technology industry, but care should be taken, both with specialists and with the wider stakeholder community, to avoid confusing the concept of "master data" with that of "mastering data".

Implementation models 
There are a number of models for implementing a technology solution for master data management.  These depend on an organisation's core business, its corporate structure and its goals. These include:

 Source of record
 Registry 
 Consolidation
 Coexistence
 Transaction/centralized

Source of record 
This model identifies a single application, database or simpler source (e.g. a spreadsheet) as being the "source of record" (or "system of record" where solely application databases are relied on). The benefit of this model is its conceptual simplicity, but it may not fit with the realities of complex master data distribution in large organisations.

The source of record can be federated, for example by groups of attribute (so that different attributes of a master data entity may have different sources of record) or geographically (so that different parts of an organisation may have different master sources).  Federation is only applicable in certain use cases, where there is clear delineation of which subsets of records will be found in which sources.

The source of record model can be applied more widely than simply to master data, for example to reference data.

Transmission of master data 
There are several ways in which master data may be collated and distributed to other systems. This include:

 Data consolidation – The process of capturing master data from multiple sources and integrating into a single hub (operational data store) for replication to other destination systems.
Data federation – The process of providing a single virtual view of master data from one or more sources to one or more destination systems.
 Data propagation – The process of copying master data from one system to another, typically through point-to-point interfaces in legacy systems.

Change management in implementation
Master data management can suffer in its adoption within a large organization if the "single version of the truth" concept is not affirmed by stakeholders, who believe that their local definition of the master data is necessary.  For example, the product hierarchy used to manage inventory may be entirely different from the product hierarchies used to support marketing efforts or pay sales reps.  It is above all necessary to identify if different master data is genuinely required.  If it is required, then the solution implemented (technology and process) must be able to allow multiple versions of the truth to exist, but will provide simple, transparent ways to reconcile the necessary differences. If it is not required, processes must be adjusted.  Without this active management, users that need the alternate versions will simply "go around" the official processes, thus reducing the effectiveness of the company's overall master data management program.

See also
 Business semantics management
 Customer data integration
 Data governance
 Data integration
 Data steward
 Data visualization
 Enterprise information integration
 Information management
 Linked data
 Master data
 Operational data store
 Product information management
Record linkage
 Reference data
 Semantic Web
 Single customer view
 Web data integration

References

External links
 Reprise: When is Master Data and MDM Not Master Data or MDM?

Business intelligence
Data management
Data warehousing
Information management